Coleophora ahenella is a moth of the family Coleophoridae. It is found in all of Europe, except Ireland and the Balkan Peninsula.

Adults are unicolourous grey with a slight sheen. They are on wing in May and June.

The larvae feed on Cornus mas, Cornus sanguinea, Lonicera alpigena, Lonicera nigra, Lonicera xylosteum, Lonicera chrysantha, Rhamnus catharticus, Rhamnus frangula, Symphoricarpos albus and Viburnum lantana. The mouth angle is 0°, causing the case to lie flat on the leaf. The case is gradually enlarged by the addition of rings that are cut out of the lower epidermis of the mine. In Great Britain, the larvae live for two years.

References

External links
 

ahenella
Moths described in 1877
Moths of Europe